Four Rooms is a 1995 American anthology 
farce black comedy film co-written and co-directed by Allison Anders, Alexandre Rockwell, Robert Rodriguez, and Quentin Tarantino, loosely based on the adult short fiction writings of Roald Dahl. The story is set in the fictional Hotel Mon Signor in Los Angeles on New Year's Eve. Tim Roth plays Ted, the bellhop and main character in the frame story, whose first night on the job consists of four very different encounters with various hotel guests. 

The film received mixed reviews from critics who praised the segments directed by Rodriguez and Tarantino, but heavily criticized the segments by Anders and Rockwell.

Plot
On New Year's Eve, bellhop Sam (Marc Lawrence) of the Hotel Mon Signor briefs his replacement, Ted (Tim Roth).

The film's animated opening credits, inspired by the cartoons of The Pink Panther Show, feature the scat song "Vertigogo" by Combustible Edison.

Honeymoon Suite – "The Missing Ingredient"
Written and directed by Allison Anders
Ted assists a group of unusual women with their luggage, which he brings to the Honeymoon Suite. He learns they are a coven of witches, attempting to reverse a spell cast on their goddess, Diana (Amanda De Cadenet). The ritual requires them each to place an ingredient into a large cauldron; however, one (Ione Skye) has still to retrieve her ingredient – semen – with one hour left. She seduces Ted and they have sex in the cauldron. He leaves and they complete the ritual, and Diana emerges from the cauldron.

After Ted's service in the honeymoon suite, a party guest from another room (Lawrence Bender) calls the front desk for some ice. He is unsure which floor he is on, but eventually directs Ted to Room 404.

Room 404 – "The Wrong Man"
Written and directed by Alexandre Rockwell
At Room 404, Ted finds himself in a fantasy hostage situation. Sigfried (David Proval) maniacally accuses Ted, whom he calls Theodore, of having slept with his wife Angela (Jennifer Beals). Ted is forced at gunpoint to participate in the scenario, uncertain what is real. He becomes stuck in the bathroom window as the party guest appears in the window above, uttering the word "ice" and vomiting. Ted escapes, just as another guest (Paul Skemp) arrives, looking for Room 404, and is greeted by Sigfried in the same manner.

Room 309 – "The Misbehavers"
Written and directed by Robert Rodriguez 
A husband (Antonio Banderas) and wife (Tamlyn Tomita) leave for a New Year's Eve party, tipping Ted $500 to keep an eye on their children, Sarah and Juancho (Lana McKissack and Danny Verduzco). Ted instructs the children to stay in their room; when he leaves, they vandalize the room, exploding a bottle of champagne. They call Ted for toothbrushes, and he tries unsuccessfully to put them to bed. He leaves but is summoned back to find the room in further chaos: a painting has been turned into a dartboard with lipstick and a syringe, Juancho has a cigarette, Sarah has a bottle of liquor, the television is set to an adult channel, and the children have found a dead prostitute (Patricia Vonne) in the box spring. Sarah stabs Ted in the leg with the syringe when he repeatedly uses the word "whore" and Juancho accidentally sets the room on fire. Their father returns, carrying his passed-out wife, and asks Ted, "Did they misbehave?" The sprinkler system activates while everyone stands still.

Unsettled, Ted calls his boss Betty (Kathy Griffin) to quit. After a conversation with Margaret (Marisa Tomei), he gets Betty on the phone and tries to quit, but receives a call from the hotel penthouse. Betty convinces him to stay and tend to the guests.

Penthouse – "The Man from Hollywood"
Written and directed by Quentin Tarantino, adapted from "Man from the South" by Roald Dahl

The penthouse is occupied by famous director Chester Rush (Tarantino) and his friends, including Angela. They request a block of wood, three nails, a ball of twine, a bucket of ice, a doughnut for Chester, a club sandwich for Angela, and a hatchet "as sharp as the Devil himself". Ted is invited to join their challenge: Chester's friend Norman (Paul Calderón) has bet he can light his Zippo cigarette lighter ten times in a row; if Norman succeeds, he will win Chester's car, but if he fails, his pinky will be cut off. Ted, asked to "wield the hatchet" should Norman fail, tries to leave, but Chester offers $100 to hear them out and another $900 to perform this assigned role. Norman's lighter fails on the first try, and Ted immediately chops off his pinky, sweeps up the money, and leaves the penthouse with an energetic step. As the credits roll, Chester and company frantically prepare to take a screaming Norman to the hospital.

Cast
Tim Roth as Ted
Marc Lawrence as Sam

"The Missing Ingredient"
Sammi Davis as Jezebel
Amanda de Cadenet as Diana
Valeria Golino as Athena
Madonna as Elspeth
Ione Skye as Eva
Lili Taylor as Raven
Alicia Witt as Kiva

"The Wrong Man"
David Proval as Siegfried
Jennifer Beals as Angela
Lawrence Bender as Long Hair Yuppie Scum
Paul Skemp as Real Theodore
Quinn Thomas Hellerman as Baby Bellhop

"The Misbehavers"
Antonio Banderas as Husband
Tamlyn Tomita as Wife
Lana McKissack as Sarah
Danny Verduzco as Juancho
Patricia Vonne as Corpse
Salma Hayek as TV Dancing Girl

Betty's house
Kathy Griffin as Betty
Marisa Tomei as Margaret
Julie McClean as Left Redhead
Laura Rush as Right Redhead

"The Man from Hollywood"
Quentin Tarantino as Chester Rush
Jennifer Beals as Angela
Paul Calderón as Norman
Bruce Willis as Leo (uncredited)
Kimberly Blair as Hooker (uncredited)

Crossovers between rooms
The four segments are shown chronologically, except for "The Misbehavers", the events of which both precede and succeed the events of "The Wrong Man".

There are some connections between the four segments:
In "The Wrong Man", Ted recalls the witches' ritual in "The Missing Ingredient" with the expression "weird voodoo thing".
Ted can be seen with the two cherries from "The Missing Ingredient" at the beginning of "The Misbehavers".
Sarah in "The Misbehavers" calls a random room to ask a question. The man who picks up happens to be Siegfried from "The Wrong Man".
Angela appears in both "The Wrong Man" and "The Man from Hollywood".
When calling his boss, just before the beginning of "The Man from Hollywood", Ted recalls the events of the first three segments.

Production
Miramax presold Japanese distribution rights to Shochiku along with  Gary Fleder’s Things to Do in Denver When You’re Dead, George T. Miller’s Robinson Crusoe, John Ehle’s The Journey of August King and Halloween 6 in a bulk acquisition deal.

Reception

Critical reception
James Berardinelli of ReelViews described it as "one of 1995's major disappointments". Hal Hinson of The Washington Post said it "asserts itself as a goof so laboriously and aggressively that you almost feel pinned back in your seat". Roger Ebert of the Chicago-Sun Times ranked Rodriguez's segment as the best by far and also best capitalizing on Roth. Tarantino's segment was well-made but undistinguished while Ebert declared Anders's efforts were "disappointing" and Rockwell "unsuccessful".

The film won a Razzie Award for Worst Supporting Actress for Madonna.

The film holds a 13% "Rotten" rating from Rotten Tomatoes based on 45 reviews. The critical consensus reads: "Four Rooms comes stocked with a ton of talent on both sides of the camera, yet only manages to add up to a particularly uneven – and dismayingly uninspired – anthology effort.

Box office
The film grossed $4,257,354 in only 319 theaters.

Soundtrack

The soundtrack features a score composed and performed by contemporary lounge music band Combustible Edison, coproduced by Mark Mothersbaugh. Additional music is by Juan García Esquivel.

Track listing
"Vertigogo (Opening Theme)" (Combustible Edison)  – 2:35
Tracks 2–11 from "The Missing Ingredient":
"Junglero"  – 1:54
"Four Rooms Swing"  – 2:11
"Theme From 'Bewitched'" (Howard Greenfield and Jack Keller)  – 1:01
"Tea and Eva In The Elevator"  – 0:55
"Invocation"  – 1:26
"Breakfast At Denny's"  – 3:57
"Strange Brew"  – 0:27
"Coven Of Witches"  – 0:59
"The Earthly Diana"  – 0:36
"Eva Seduces Ted"  – 2:10
Tracks 12–17 from "The Wrong Man":
"Hallway Ted"  – 0:31
"Headshake Rhumba"  – 0:41
"Skippen, Pukin, Siegfried"  – 0:29
"Angela"  – 0:46
"Punch Drunk"  – 2:57
"Male Bonding"  – 3:06
Tracks 18–25 from "The Misbehavers":
"Mariachi"  – 0:29
"Antes De Medianoche"  – 2:45
"Sentimental Journey" (Written by Bud Green, Les Brown and Ben Homer, performed by Esquivel)  – 2:39
"Kids Watch TV"  – 2:03
"Champagne and Needles"  – 2:06
"Bullseye"  – 1:01
"Harlem Nocturne" (Written by Earle Hagen, performed by Esquivel)  – 2:30
"The Millionaire's Holiday"  – 2:13
Tracks 26–29 from "The Man from Hollywood":
"Ted-o-vater"  – 0:39
"Vertigogo (Closing Credits)"  – 5:33
"'D' In The Hallway Credits"  – 0:25
"Torchy"  – 0:16

References

External links
 
 
 

1995 films
1990s black comedy films
1995 independent films
A Band Apart films
American anthology films
American black comedy films
American films with live action and animation
American independent films
1990s English-language films
Films based on short fiction
Films based on works by Roald Dahl
Films directed by Allison Anders
Films directed by Alexandre Rockwell
Films directed by Robert Rodriguez
Films directed by Quentin Tarantino
Films produced by Lawrence Bender
Films set in hotels
Films set in Los Angeles
Films set around New Year
Films with screenplays by Robert Rodriguez
Films with screenplays by Quentin Tarantino
Films about witchcraft
Films based on classical mythology
Diana (mythology)
Golden Raspberry Award winning films
1990s American films